Asano Nagatake (May 7, 1895 – January 3, 1969) was the 29th family head of the Asano clan, which ruled over Hiroshima Domain before 1871.

Family
 Father: Asano Nagayuki
 Wives:
 Princess Fushimi no Miya Yasuko (1898–1919), daughter of Prince Fushimi Hiroyasu
 Princess Yamashina no Miya Yasuko (1901–1974), daughter of Prince Yamashina Kikumaro
 Children:
 Asano Nagayoshi by Yamashina no Miya Yasuko
 Marquis Yamashina Yoshimasa by Yamashina no Miya Yasuko
 Yoriko married Tokugawa Kuninari of Mito-Tokugawa family by Yamashina no Miya Yasuko

References

Members of the House of Peers (Japan)
1895 births
1969 deaths
Asano clan